The women's 5000 metres at the 2012 African Championships in Athletics was held at the Stade Charles de Gaulle on  28 June.

Medalists

Records

Schedule

Results

Final

References

Results

5000 Women
5000 metres at the African Championships in Athletics
2012 in women's athletics